Vinište or Vinishte (Cyrillic: Виниште) may refer to the following places:

Bulgaria
Vinishte, Bulgaria

Bosnia and Herzegovina
Vinište (Konjic)
Vinište, Žepče